Albert Crusat Domènech (born 13 May 1982) is a Spanish retired footballer who played as a left winger.

After starting out at Espanyol, he spent most of his professional career with Almería, appearing in 212 competitive matches and scoring 34 goals over six seasons, four of those in La Liga. He also played two years in England with Wigan Athletic.

Club career

Early years
Born in Barcelona, Catalonia, Crusat was a product of local RCD Espanyol's youth system. He appeared in five games with the first team during the 2002–03 season, the first on 2 September 2002 in a 2–0 away loss against Real Madrid where he played five minutes as a starter, as the club went on to barely avoid La Liga relegation.

Subsequently, Crusat had Segunda División stints with Rayo Vallecano and UE Lleida: in the first, as the Madrid side were relegated, he only managed to take the field on five occasions, leaving in December 2003.

Almería
In 2005–06, Crusat joined UD Almería, being instrumental in the Andalusians' first-ever top-flight promotion the following season by scoring 11 goals. He missed just four games in the subsequent eighth-place finish in the 2007–08 campaign, totalling 2,693 minutes of action.

Crusat had his most successful year in the top division in 2009–10, as his team retained their status for the third consecutive year. Without the presence of striker Álvaro Negredo, he was much more depended upon in scoring matters and netted seven times in 33 matches – joint-second in the team – as they finished in 13th position (he also collected 13 yellow cards).

On 19 January 2011, Crusat scored one of Almería's most important goals, in a 3–2 win at Deportivo de La Coruña (4–2 on aggregate) which meant the club reached the semi-finals of the Copa del Rey for the first time ever.

Wigan Athletic
On 30 August 2011, it was confirmed by Wigan Athletic manager Roberto Martínez that his compatriot Crusat was having a medical after a £2 million bid was accepted by Almería. Four days later, the player completed his move to the English club, and made his Premier League debut on 10 September, appearing as a substitute in a 3–0 away loss to Manchester City.

Crusat scored his first goal for the Latics on 19 November 2011, making it 3–2 for the hosts in the 88th minute of an eventual 3–3 draw against Blackburn Rovers. He spent the vast majority of his second season on the sidelines, nursing a severe knee injury, and left the DW Stadium on 22 May 2013 after his contract expired.

Bnei Sakhnin
On 30 January 2014, after more than one year away from football, Crusat joined Bnei Sakhnin F.C. of the Israel Premier League. In September, after recurring problems in his knee, he retired at the age of 32 and with the intention of getting a manager degree.

Honours
Lleida
Segunda División B: 2003–04

Spain U16
UEFA European Under-16 Championship: 1999

References

External links

1982 births
Living people
Spanish footballers
Footballers from Barcelona
Association football wingers
La Liga players
Segunda División players
Segunda División B players
RCD Espanyol B footballers
RCD Espanyol footballers
Rayo Vallecano players
UE Lleida players
UD Almería players
Premier League players
Wigan Athletic F.C. players
Israeli Premier League players
Bnei Sakhnin F.C. players
Spain youth international footballers
Catalonia international footballers
Spanish expatriate footballers
Expatriate footballers in England
Expatriate footballers in Israel
Spanish expatriate sportspeople in England
Spanish expatriate sportspeople in Israel